Gunfighter was a comic published by EC Comics from 1948 to 1950, with a total of nine issues. It was part of EC's Pre-"trend comics" era.

Publication history
Gunfighter (renamed from Fat and Slat, four issues), was a comic based on western/crime stories. The comic ran for nine issues, but was then later renamed again to The Haunt of Fear.

References

EC Comics publications
Comics magazines published in the United States
1948 comics debuts
1950 comics endings
Magazines established in 1948
Magazines disestablished in 1950
Bimonthly magazines published in the United States
Western (genre) comics
Defunct American comics